Automolis aurantiifusa is a moth of the family Erebidae. It was described by Rothschild in 1913. It is found in the Afrotropical realm.

References

Moths described in 1913
Syntomini
Erebid moths of Africa